225 Bush Street, originally known as the Standard Oil Building, is a , 25-floor office building in the financial district of San Francisco.  The building includes 21 floors of office space, 1 floor of retail, 1 storage floor and 2 basement levels including the garage. It was the tallest building in the city from its completion in 1922 until 1925.

It is a historic building, serving as the headquarters for Standard Oil of California, now Chevron, for over half a century. Architect George W. Kelham designed the Standard Oil Building for John D. Rockefeller and modeled it on the Federal Reserve Bank of New York Building. Composed of two buildings, the old wing was built in the 1920s. The new wing was built in the 1950s.

Tenants
Tenants include:
Outbrain
Blue Shield of California
General Assembly
Heap (HQ)
Handshake (HQ)
Khoros (former HQ)
LendUp (HQ)
Twitch 
D2iQ (HQ)
Meltwater (HQ)
Benefit Cosmetics (HQ)
Ginger.io (HQ)
TinyCo (HQ)
RocketSpace
LiveRamp (HQ)
Synergy (HQ)
Mercari
SmartRecruiters
SpringerNature
Sunrun (HQ)

References

External links
 

Financial District, San Francisco
Office buildings completed in 1922
Skyscraper office buildings in San Francisco